Sergey Vasilevich Sosedov (born  23 May 1968) is a Russian journalist and music critic who served as a judge on televised music contests.

Early life 

He was born 23 May 1968, in Moscow. In 1983 he completed seven years of piano study, taught by Irma Georgievna Paruhova. From 1984 to 1993 attended lectures on theory and music history. In 1988 he attended courses and directed at the Moscow Regional Institute of Culture. In 1996, he graduated with honors in newspaper and magazine journalism at Moscow State University.

Career 

His first published work appeared in the  tone  14 May 1989. It was an interview with singer Edita Piekha.

He first worked as a journalist at Goudok (1989–1992), then worked as a correspondent for Russian Conduct (1994–1996) and as a music columnist for the weekly Wednesday (1997–2000).

In 1994-1996, he worked as a freelance correspondent for the newspaper Russian Conduct. From January 1997 to July 1998, he worked as a press manager of operation Concert Hall (now the Academic) of the Russian Academy of Sciences. From December 1998 to April 2000 he was a correspondent for the weekly Wednesday of ZAO Concern Vechernyaya Moskva. From May 2000 to May 2001 he was music columnist for League Nation.

In June 2001 Sosedov became the music editor browser ANO Rock Country (PR-help in promotion of young rock singers).

Sosedov became known after his participation on Shark Pen, which appeared on the Russian channel TV-6 from 1995-1998. Later, as an invited expert Sosedov participated in the religious TV program Canon on TV-6. He served on the jury for the TV contest Superstar on Channel NTV in October–December 2007 and in October–December 2008. In September 2010 he was one of four judges on the singing show X Factor on the Ukrainian TV channel STB.

Personal life 
Sosyedov is openly gay.

References

External links

 Official Website

Soviet journalists
Russian male journalists
Russian gay writers
Gay entertainers
Gay journalists
1968 births
Living people
Russian LGBT journalists
20th-century Russian journalists
21st-century Russian journalists
Moscow State University alumni
Russian music critics
Russian television presenters